Joseph Taylor (16 December 1850 – 4 October 1888) was a Scottish amateur footballer who played for Scotland in the first ever international football match against England in 1872.

Taylor is regarded as an important figure in early international football, playing in all of Scotland's first six international games, and captaining them on two occasions. A fullback, Taylor played for Queen's Park with whom he won the Scottish Cup in 1874, 1875 and 1876.

His final international appearance came in the first international match against Wales on 25 March 1876. After retirement from football in 1877, Taylor was appointed Club President of Queen's Park.

Honours
Scottish Cup: 1874, 1875, 1876

See also
List of Scotland national football team captains

References

External links

1850 births
1888 deaths
People from Dunoon
Scottish footballers
Scotland international footballers
Queen's Park F.C. players
Association football fullbacks
Sportspeople from Argyll and Bute
Burials at Cathcart Cemetery